Linger Awhile: Live at Newport and More is a 2000 album by Sarah Vaughan, featuring eight tracks recorded at the 1957 Newport Jazz Festival and studio tracks from 1978 and 1982.

Track listing
 "If This Isn't Love" (Yip Harburg, Burton Lane) – 2:22
 "(I'm Afraid) The Masquerade Is Over" (Herb Magidson, Allie Wrubel) – 4:38
 "All of Me" (Gerald Marks, Seymour Simons) – 2:33
 "Black Coffee" (Sonny Burke, Paul Francis Webster) – 3:39
 "Sometimes I'm Happy (Sometimes I'm Blue)" (Irving Caesar, Clifford Grey, Vincent Youmans) – 2:09
 "Poor Butterfly" (Raymond Hubbell, John Golden) – 4:44
 "Linger Awhile" (Harry Owens, Vincent Rose) – 1:52
 Medley: "Time"/"Tenderly" (Bobby Bryant)/(Walter Gross, Jack Lawrence) – 5:16
 "I Didn't Know What Time It Was" (Lorenz Hart, Richard Rodgers) – 3:13
 "I Got It Bad (and That Ain't Good)" (Duke Ellington, Webster) – 4:32
 "That's All" (Alan Brandt, Bob Haymes) – 4:01
 "I Let a Song Go Out of My Heart" (Ellington, Irving Mills, Henry Nemo, John Redmond) – 3:10
 "I'm Just a Lucky So-and-So" (Mack David, Ellington) – 4:24
 "Teach Me Tonight" (Sammy Cahn, Gene de Paul) – 3:05
 "Just Friends" (John Klenner, Sam M. Lewis) – 3:21
 "I Hadn't Anyone Till You" (Ray Noble) – 4:06

Personnel
 Sarah Vaughan – vocal

References

Albums produced by Norman Granz
Albums recorded at the Newport Jazz Festival
2000 live albums
Sarah Vaughan live albums
Concord Records live albums
1957 in Rhode Island